This is a list of official languages for major international and regional institutions. Different organizations sometimes refer to their principal languages of administration and communication as "working languages", while others refer to these as being "official". No distinction is made here, except where an organization itself, distinguishes between its official and working languages.

English and French are often regarded as the symbolic official languages, although the former has gained prominence in recent years.

International
According to a recent study of multilingualism in 13 major international organizations (Commonwealth, ICC, ILO, IMF, IOC, IPU, ITU, OECD, UN, UPU, WB, WHO, and WTO), the English is an official language in almost all (12). This is followed by French (10); Spanish (6); and Arabic, Chinese, and Russian (3 each). Interpretation is offered in Japanese and German as well for 2 organizations.

The six official languages of the United Nations reflects the languages of the permanent members of the Security Council (Chinese, English, French, and Russian), in addition to Arabic and Spanish. Another study found that the percentage of each language used at each United Nations meeting in 2010 was distributed as follows: English (98%), French (87%), Spanish (34%), Russian (10%), Arabic (7%), and Chinese (3%).

The following is a list of major international and inter-governmental organizations.

Regional
The following is a list of major regional organizations.

Defunct

See also
List of official languages by state
Working language
List of international organisations which have French as an official language

Further reading
 Elena Aronova, "Russian and the Making of World Languages during the Cold War," Link

References

External links 
World Auxiliary Language Campaign Facts page

Language policy
 
official languages by institution
Official languages